Lee Mitchell Smart  (born 5 April 1988) in Swindon, Wiltshire, is a former motorcycle speedway rider from England.

Career
Smart raced for the Mildenhall Fen Tigers in the Premier League in 2008 after being released by the Birmingham Brummies mid-season, having previously been part of the Fen Tigers multi-trophy winning Conference League team in 2004.

During the 2010 National League speedway season he won the National League Riders' Championship.

He signed to race for Stoke Potters in the National League in 2013. His last season before retirement was riding for Poole Pirates in the 2014 Elite League speedway season and although he only rode four times the team won the title.

References 

1988 births
Living people
British speedway riders
English motorcycle racers
Sportspeople from Swindon
Birmingham Brummies riders
Mildenhall Fen Tigers riders
Somerset Rebels riders
Stoke Potters riders